Carnation refers to Dianthus caryophyllus, a flowering plant.

Carnation may also refer to:

Other
 Carnation, Oregon, a U.S. unincorporated community
 Carnation, Washington, a U.S. city
 Carnation Revolution, a 1974 revolution in Portugal
 Carnation (TV series), a Japanese TV series
 2S1 Gvozdika (Carnation), a Soviet 122-mm self-propelled howitzer

Brands
 Carnation (brand), a food and drink brand
 Car-Nation (also known as "Carnation"), a 1910s automobile brand

Colours
 Carnation (colour), the colour of the flower of a carnation plant
 Carnation (heraldry), the colour of flesh (pale pink)
 Carnation (painting), the colour of flesh

Music
 The Carnations, a Canadian indie rock band
 Carnation (album), a 2002 album by Astrid Williamson
 "Carnation" (song), a 2011 song by Ringo Sheena
 "Carnation", a song by The Jam originally released on The Gift